Rāzna National Park is a national park in the Latgale region of Latvia. The initiative to create the Rāzna National Park out of an already existing nature park came from the Daugavpils University.

This national park was created to protect Lake Rāzna, the second largest lake in Latvia, and the surrounding areas. Because of this, 14% of the surface area of the national park consists of water surfaces. Valuable ecosystems - natural deciduous forests with many rare species of plants are found on several of the 26 islands in Ežezers lake. Of high value are also the semi-natural grasslands.

See also
 List of national parks in the Baltics

References 

National parks of Latvia
Protected areas established in 2007
2007 establishments in Latvia